The Surf-class was a light non self-righting displacement hull motor lifeboat built between 1935 and 1940 and operated by the Royal National Lifeboat Institution (RNLI) between 1936 and 1965.

History
Designed by RNLI Naval Architect James Barnett, the Surf-class was the smallest and lightest offshore motor lifeboat produced by the Institution. Intended for stations where launching heavier boats would be difficult, the Surf-class enabled the RNLI to replace pulling and sailing lifeboats and plug gaps in motor lifeboat cover. The boats however, were only really suitable for inshore work in moderate conditions and they only had long service lives at two stations.

Description
The first two boats were completely open with no shelter, not considered to be a problem for the kind of services that they were intended for. The boats were powered by two 2-cylinder Weyburn F2 horizontal petrol engines and whereas the first boat had twin screws, the second was propelled by Hotchkiss cones, a kind of water impeller. While this was a benefit in shallow waters, the cone powered boat was around  slower than the screw version.

The first two boats served for less than ten years before being sold off. The second batch appeared in 1938 and had  more beam and were fitted with a shelter ahead of the (tiller) steering position. All but one featured Hotchkiss cone propulsion, RNLB Kate Greatore (ON 816) was fitted with Gill water jets. These boats served for 10 to 12 years at most of their stations before being replaced by standard carriage launched boats, but at two locations, Poole and Newburgh, Surf-class boats continued into the sixties. With its withdrawal, the Newburgh station was closed.

Fleet

External links
RNLI

Royal National Lifeboat Institution lifeboats